ClubHouze (formerly named Brightstars Education) is an Australian early childhood learning provider for children aged 3 – 7 years. Programs are a combination of movement, music and creativity. ClubHouze locations include Melbourne and Sydney.

History 
ClubHouze was founded as Brightstars in 2003. The company re-branded in April 2010 and changed its name to “ClubHouze”.  The re-brand came after a series of changes within the company since it was purchased by Marinya Holdings Pty Ltd at the end of 2008. These changes included the separation from the Brightstars Talent Agency and discontinuation of the “Model TV” program.

In 2011, ClubHouze changed the structure of the company to early learning through the creative arts. This change meant that the company no longer ran classes for children over the age of seven.

Programs 
In 2008, Drew Anthony joined Brightstars as Program Director. Between 2008 and 2010 ClubHouze ran combined music and dance classes for 3 and 4 year olds and combined acting, singing and dance classes for 5 and 6 year olds. The company also had performing arts classes for 7 to 9 year olds and 10 - 13 year olds.

In 2011, the programs were changed due to the new of direction of the company. It is believed that ClubHouze are designing classes that will allow for children’s progressive learning of basic literacy and numeracy through the creative arts.

Terms are 10 weeks long. Classes are held twice a week for 10 weeks.

Staff

Teachers 
Teachers at ClubHouze by law undertake a Government Working With Children Check ("WWCC")

Principals 
ClubHouze locations have full-time principals. Each principal has a Working With Children Check.

Guest choreographers 
In 2010 ClubHouze had guest choreographers for the hip-hop dance program. In Term 1, So You Think You Can Dance contestant Heath Keating helped create a program, followed by SYTYCD hopeful Jess Stokes in Term 3.

BJ Rourke from So You Think You Can Dance 2009 Top 6 (Term 3, 2009) and 2008 SYTYCD Top 10 dancer, Rhiannon Villareal (Term 4, 2009)were guest choreographers in 2010.

References

External links
Brightstars Website
ClubHouze Website

Schools of the performing arts in Australia